Cora Pearl (born Eliza Emma Crouch; December 1836 – 8 July 1886) was an English courtesan or cocotte of the French demimonde who became most well known during the period of the Second French Empire.

Early life
Eliza Emma Crouch was born in Plymouth in December 1836, just a few months before the introduction of civil registration in England and Wales. She was baptised at St Andrew's Church, Plymouth together with her younger sister Hannah Lydia (born 30 November 1837) on 27 December 1837. Her subsequent use of her sister Louisa's birth certificate in her 1886 Mémoires, amended to appear as if it were her own, led to over a century of confusion over her date of birth. The exact date of her birth in December is still unknown.

Her father was the cellist and composer Frederick Nicholls Crouch, who married her mother, the contralto Lydia (née Pearson), at St Paul's Church, Covent Garden in 1832. By April 1841, Crouch had returned to London, leaving his wife and daughters in Plymouth. In 1843, he went through a Roman Catholic marriage ceremony with Elizabeth 'Bessie' George and had two more children. He left for the United States in 1849, leaving both wives and families behind. With several young children to care for, Crouch's mother Lydia brought Richard William Littley into the household, who was to be considered a “stepfather” by her children.

Crouch was sent to a convent boarding school in Boulogne, France, but later returned to live with her paternal grandmother, Anna Maria (née Nicholls). Following the death of her husband, Crouch's paternal grandfather, Anna Maria married the former Secretary of the Royal Philharmonic Society, violinist, composer and arranger William Watts. In 1851, Crouch and her sister Hannah were living with their paternal grandparents in Jersey, an experience Crouch found confining, leading her to defy her grandmother's cautions regarding the dangers that a young woman faced out in the streets unchaperoned. Whilst out on her own one day, Crouch, approximately twenty years old at the time, accepted the advances of an older man who approached her on the street, allowing him to take her to a drinking den, where he bought her cakes to eat and alcohol to drink, ultimately leading to the man raping Crouch, a virgin at that time.

Upon awakening, Crouch found the man had left her a five-pound note — more money than she had ever seen. Crouch later said the encounter left her with "an instinctive horror of men". After her sexual assault, Crouch did not return to her grandmother's home or that of her mother's, but rented a room for herself in Covent Garden.

Life in London
On her own in London, Crouch made the acquaintance of Robert Bignell, proprietor of a notorious pleasure establishment, the Argyll Rooms. Providing the combination of a bar, a dance hall and women available for hire, the establishment provided private alcoves and rooms where couples could retire for sexual activity. Crouch soon vacated her single room and moved into a suite at the Argyll Rooms, becoming Bignell's mistress.

Studying the life around her, Crouch realized that the life of the common prostitute was a tragic one, with the best result being that a woman could end up "poor and degraded", and the worst being a future that held "disease and death". Crouch resolved to practice the trade with higher expectations, with the goal of becoming the kept woman of select dedicated lovers with the financial means to keep her in luxury.

Crouch's involvement with Bignell lasted for some time, with the two traveling to Paris, posing as a married couple. Crouch became so enamoured with the city of Paris that she insisted that Bignell return to London without her, determined to remain in the French capital. It was at this time that Crouch took on the name "Cora Pearl", a pseudonym chosen to resonate with the new identity and future she hoped to craft for herself in Paris.

Life as a courtesan

She worked for him for six years.

Her first lover of distinction was the twenty five year old Victor Masséna, third Duke du Rivoli, and later fifth Prince of Essling. Masséna set Pearl up in opulence, gifting her money, jewels, servants, and a private chef. He provided her with funds for gambling when she visited the casinos and racecourse in the fashionable resort of Baden, Germany, and bought her the first horse Pearl ever owned. During this time, Pearl became an accomplished horsewoman; it was said "she rode like an Amazon" and "was kinder to her horses than her lovers". Her liaison with Masséna lasted five years. While cultivating Masséna, she was simultaneously sharing her favours with Prince Achille Murat, a man eleven years younger than Masséna.

By 1860, Pearl was one of the most celebrated courtesans in Paris. She was the mistress of notable aristocrats, the Prince of Orange, heir to the throne of the Netherlands, Ludovic, Duc de Grammont-Caderousse, and more significantly Charles Duc de Morny, who was the half-brother of the Emperor Napoleon III. The Emperor's brother generously contributed to the life Pearl demanded.

In 1864, Pearl rented a chateau in the region of the Loiret. Her boudoir had a custom-made bronze bath monogrammed with her initials intertwined in gold. The château was conceived for gala entertainments, and there were rarely fewer than fifteen guests at the dinner table, with the chef instructed to spare no cost on the expenditure for food. Pearl was known for devising entertainments of an unexpected and outrageous theatricality, of which she invariably was the star attraction. On one such evening, she dared the group assembled around the dinner table "to cut into the next dish" about to be served. The meal's next course was Cora Pearl herself, presented lying naked on a huge silver platter, garnished with parsley, and carried in by four large men.

Her most dedicated benefactor and enduring admirer was Joseph Charles Paul Bonaparte, the Emperor's cousin. She met the prince in 1868 when he was forty two years old, and their liaison lasted nine years, the longest relationship in Pearl's career.

In 1860, Pearl made an appearance at a masquerade ball attended by the elite of Parisian society. She caused a sensation in appearing as a scantily costumed Eve, whose degree of nudity diverged little from the biblical original. It was written that "Cora Pearl made an appearance half-naked on the stage. That evening the Jockey Club in its entirety, graced the theatre.

The highest point of Pearl’s career as courtesan were the years 1865-1870. In his biography of Pearl, The Pearl From Plymouth (1950), W. H. Holden wrote that there was evidence that Pearl regularly sent money to both her mother in England and father in America. For Pearl, money was for spending, for accumulating the luxuries of life, and buying her way to a coveted perch in the upper echelons of society. Her jewel collection alone was valued at some one million francs; at one point, she owned three homes, and her clothing was made for her by the renowned couturier Charles Frederick Worth. As her career prospered, the gifts from her suitors needed to be both costly and imaginative. She pitted her admirers against one another, raising the price for her favours as the game between competitors escalated. In her heyday, she was able to command as high a price as ten thousand francs for an evening's entertainment.

Celebrity

Pearl was known for dressing creatively, with the intent to provoke either shock or awe.  wrote of her affinity for dying her hair bold colors; she was once seen riding out in her carriage, her hair the color of a lemon, dyed to match the carriage's yellow satin interior. In another instance, she appeared in a blue gown, her dog’s coat dyed to match her wardrobe.

Pearl also utilized makeup in a manner heavier than most women of the time, using makeup to accentuate her eyes and eyelashes, and wearing face powder tinted with silver or pearls to give her skin a shimmering appearance. Jean-Philippe Worth, the son of the couturier Worth, pronounced her "shockingly overdone" in this aspect. In 1867, a drink came into vogue, inspired by Pearl, dubbed the "Tears of Cora Pearl". Everywhere they talk only of you…"

Decline

At the age of thirty seven, Pearl found herself involved in a relationship that would ultimately result in the decline of her success and fortune. Pearl had become embroiled in a relationship with a wealthy young man, Alexandre Duval, ten years her junior, whose obsession for her was so intense that he spent his entire fortune on sustaining his liaison with her, gifting her jewels, fine horses, and money. It was reported that at one point, Duval gave her an exquisitely bound book, a hundred-page volume where each page was bookmarked by a one thousand franc bill. Pearl ultimately dismissed him, a finality that Duval could not accept.

On 19 December 1872, Duval went to her home, it is believed, with the intention of killing her. The gun he brought accidentally discharged, wounding him near fatally; initially near death, he eventually recovered, though the consequences of the event proved disastrous for Pearl's reputation. The contents of her Paris home were sold.

Financial difficulties
The Franco-Prussian War of 1870 brought at its end a new French Republic, as well as cultural and political changes to French society. The era in which Pearl had achieved her greatest success was over, with the French Third Republic seeing diminution of aristocratic privilege and a resurgence of conservative values. Pearl was no longer able to attract the titled men who had been her prime clients; in 1874, her long tenure as the mistress of Prince Napoleon ended at his request. He wrote her a touching, carefully worded letter of regret; he could no longer sustain the emotional and professional toll the relationship required of him.

Pearl was slowly forced to liquidate the fortune she had accumulated. While not destitute, by 1880 her financial situation had become dire. In 1873, she sold her  home, and by 1883 had returned to common prostitution, taking an apartment above the shop of a coachbuilder on the avenue , where she received clients.

Pearl's reduced finances, however, did not abate her passion for gambling. Habitually committed to playing for large stakes, she was now restricted to betting modest amounts. Julian Arnold, an old acquaintance, encountered Pearl outside a casino in Monte Carlo. He later wrote in his memoirs: "I found a woman seated on the kerbstone and weeping pitifully. She appeared to be about fifty years of age, handsome… but much bedraggled." She told him that she had been turned out of her apartment, her few belongings seized by the landlord in lieu of rent. She had no place to go, and was hungry and in misery.

Memoirs
The  had been greatly anticipated when it became known that Pearl was writing her autobiography. Published in 1886 in Paris and subsequently in England in London, Pearl claimed to have sent relevant pages to her former lovers, offering to anonymise their names if they paid her. In the event, most names were altered, though the anonymised figures of many have since been identified.

In the early 1980s, William Blatchford claimed to have located the Memoirs of Cora Pearl, which he said had been published in 1890, after Pearl's death. Supposedly an earlier version of the book published in 1886, this volume purported to date back to an earlier date, perhaps even as early 1873. Decidedly more frank and sexually explicit than the 1886 memoirs, their idiomatic English – expressive of a provincial, unsophisticated use of the language – convinced many of the work's authenticity when the memoirs were published by Granada under the title Grand Horizontal, The Erotic Memoirs of a Passionate Lady. However, Blatchford turned out to be a pseudonym adopted by the real author of the 'memoirs', Derek Parker, a former chairman of the Society of Authors, who later admitted that he had hoaxed Granada.

Death
Soon after the publication of her memoirs, Pearl became seriously ill with intestinal cancer. Her biographer Holden wrote: "The various accounts of Cora spending her last days in dire poverty in one squalid room are very much exaggerated". Pearl died on 8 July 1886, with obituary notices appearing in the London and Paris papers. Her remaining possessions were disposed of in a two-day sale in October 1886, and she was buried in Batignolles cemetery, (plot number 10, row 4), in a grave leased for five years. After those five years, what remained of her body was removed to an ossuary and the grave was reused.

References in popular culture 
Cora Pearl appears in Robert Goddard's novel Painting the Darkness in connection with her relationship with Prince Napoléon Bonaparte.

Cora Pearl appears in Robert Greene’s “The Art of Seduction,” in the chapter called “The Natural.”

Cora Pearl appears in Alexander Chee's novel The Queen of the Night in Act 2 Chapter 6

References

Sources

 
 
 
 
 
 
 
 
 

1836 births
1886 deaths
19th-century English writers
19th-century British women writers
English courtesans
Mistresses of French royalty
People from Plymouth, Devon
English memoirists
Deaths from stomach cancer
Burials at Batignolles Cemetery
British women memoirists
People of the Second French Empire
Courtesans from Paris
British emigrants to France